Adèle Thorens Goumaz (born on 15 December 1971 in Solothurn) is a Swiss politician. She has been a member of the Council of States since December 2019. Previously, she served in the National Council of Switzerland from the Canton of Vaud from 2007 to 2019. She was elected as the co-president of the Green Party of Switzerland with Regula Rytz in 2012 and announced that she would not run for re-election in 2016, leaving the post solely in Rytz's hands.

References

External links 
  
  Official website

1971 births
Living people
People from Solothurn
University of Lausanne alumni
Members of the Council of States (Switzerland)
Members of the National Council (Switzerland)
Green Party of Switzerland politicians
Women members of the National Council (Switzerland)
21st-century Swiss women politicians
21st-century Swiss politicians